Song Ha-yoon (born Kim Mi-sun on December 2, 1986) is a South Korean actress. She debuted as  Kim Byul but changed her stage name to Song Ha-yoon in 2012. She is best known for her role in the drama Fight for My Way (2017).

Filmography

Film

Television series

Music video appearances

Awards and nominations

References

External links
  

1986 births
Living people
Actresses from Seoul
JYP Entertainment artists
21st-century South Korean actresses
South Korean film actresses
South Korean television actresses
King Kong by Starship artists